Neelum Sharma (1969 – 17 August 2019) was an Indian anchor who was most well known as one of the founding anchors of Doordarshan and was a recipient of the Nari Shakti Puraskar, the highest civilian award for woman in India.

Life

Through her show Tejaswini, Neelum focused on women achievers of India. She was also a documentary filmmaker, having over 60 films to her name. She started her career with Doordarshan in 1995 and was associated with the channel for over 20 years. She died on 17 August 2019 at the age of 50 due to cancer.

References 

Indian women television journalists
2019 deaths
1969 births
Deaths from breast cancer
Deaths from cancer in India
Jamia Millia Islamia alumni